John Leo Olpindo Dato (born June 9, 1993) is a Filipino professional boxer.

Personal life
Dato was born in Bangar, La Union, Philippines. Dato is a son of Filipinos who worked as caregivers in the US, his family migrated to Bakersfield, California when he was seven years of age.

Dato attended Pioneer Valley High School in Santa Maria, California. During his high school days Dato was a wrestler, track and field player and footballer. Dato pursued his career in boxing after graduating high school when he was 17-years old. 

Dato runs the JLD Boxing Academy and also currently works as a personal trainer.

Boxing career

Featherweight division
On 15 December 2016, Dato made his professional debut in boxing. Dato defeated Mexican boxer Manuel Bernal via a Round 3 knockout (KO). Following the bout, Dato defeated Mexican boxer Guadalupe Arroyo, winning a majority decision (MD) through four rounds.

On 15 July 2017, Dato extended his winning streak in just 4 months after his win against Arroyo by defeating Mexican boxer Eduardo Ronquillo via a Round 3 knockout (KO). 5 months later, Dato registered another victory by defeating Mexican boxer Victor Manuel Martinez Flores via a Round 1 knockout (KO).

On 19 January 2018, just 1 month from his previous fight, Dato defeated American boxer Michael Gaxiola, winning a unanimous decision (UD) through four rounds, all judges scored 40–35 in favor of Dato. 6 months later, Dato received his first draw of his boxing career against Mexican boxer Pedro Antonio Rodriguez, the match ended in a technical draw (TD).

A month later following his technical draw (TD) against Rodriguez, Dato once again defeated American boxer Michael Gaxiola via a Round 4 knockout (KO).

Super Featherweight division
Following the bout, Dato moved up one division, to super featherweight, defeated Mexican boxer Jose Iniguez two months after his second fight with Gaxiola, winning a knockout (KO) in the first round. Dato once again defeated Mexican boxer Guadalupe Arroyo, winning a unanimous decision (UD) through four rounds, all judges scored 40–35 in favor of Dato.

On 11 January 2019, one month after his second win against Arroyo, Dato defeated American boxer Aaron Jamel Hollis via a Round 4 knockout (KO).

Lightweight division
Dato moved up one division, to lightweight, defeated Mexican boxer Miguel Villalobos via a Round 3 knockout (KO).

Return to Super Featherweight
Following the bout, Dato moved down one division, back to Super featherweight, defeated Mexican boxer Germán Meraz, winning a unanimous decision (UD) through six rounds.

Return to Featherweight

Pacquiao vs. Thurman
Dato returned to featherweight and defeated Mexican Boxer Juan Antonio Lopez via a Round 5 knockout (KO). The match was one of the undercard bouts in Manny Pacquiao vs. Keith Thurman pay-per-view fight.

In October 2019, Dato once again defeated Mexican boxer Germán Meraz, winning a unanimous decision (UD) through six rounds, all judges scored 60–53 in favor of Dato.

In December 2019, Dato defeated Mexican boxer David Godinez via a Round 5 KO.

Dato was scheduled to fight Dominican boxer Angel Luna in April 2020, but the fight was moved to June 2020, in response to the COVID-19 pandemic.

In August 2020, after months of waiting, Dato finally returned to the ring and defeated Mexican boxer Angel Guevara via a Round 3 TKO. Following the bout, more than two months after his win against Guevara, Dato defeated Mexican boxer Jorge Romero via a Round 5 TKO extending his unbeaten streak to 17.

Pacquiao vs. Ugás
In August 2021, it was announced that Dato is scheduled to fight Mexican Boxer Angel Antonio Contreras. The match was one of the undercard bouts in Manny Pacquiao vs. Yordenis Ugás pay-per-view fight.

Return to Super Featherweight

After more than seven months from his first professional loss, Dato moved up one division and returned to super featherweight. He was scheduled to fight Mexican veteran boxer Rodrigo Guerrero on 1 April 2022 at Chumash Casino, Sta. Ynez, California. He defeated Guerrero via a round 5 TKO.

His next fight was then scheduled on 13 January 2023 against American boxer Jesus Rizo. He defeated Rizo via a unanimous decision (UD) through eight rounds.

Professional boxing record

Titles in boxing

Minor titles
GBO California State Super Featherweight title (128 lbs)

References

External links

1993 births
Featherweight boxers
Super-featherweight boxers
Lightweight boxers
Filipino male boxers
Living people